Voldemar-Johannes Tartu (also Voldemar-Johannes Tarto; 23 April 1900 Narva – 14 December 1953 Esslingen, Germany) was an Estonian politician. He was a member of IV Riigikogu. On 16 June 1930, he resigned his position and he was replaced by Gustv-Eduard Lorenz.

References

1900 births
1953 deaths
Members of the Riigikogu, 1929–1932